Risky is the fourth studio album by the Japanese rock duo B'z. "Risky" sold 314,770 copies in its first week and 1,695,900 copies in total. It is the band's first studio album to break the million mark.

Risky was also the first of two collaborations with engineer Jason Corsaro, who has also worked with artists such as Duran Duran, The Power Station and Madonna.

The album spawned two singles, "Easy Come, Easy Go!" and "Itoshii Hitoyo Good Night…"

The album also produced the band's first (and, to date, only) official music video collection, Film Risky.

Track listing

Certifications

External links 
 B'z albums at the official site

1990 albums
B'z albums
Japanese-language albums